Bojan Dubljević (born 24 October 1991) is a Montenegrin professional basketball player and the team captain for Valencia of the Spanish Liga ACB and the EuroLeague. He also represents the senior Montenegrin national basketball team in national team competitions. Standing at 2.05 m (6 ft 8  in) tall barefoot, he plays at the power forward and center positions.

Professional career
Dubljević started his career in 2009, with Lovćen Cetinje, and he played from 2010 to 2012, with Budućnost Podgorica, before signing with the Liga ACB team Valencia Basket, on a three-year contract. In his first season at Valencia, Dubljević was named the EuroCup 2012–13 season Rising Star of the Year.

In June 2013, he extended his contract with Valencia Basket through the 2015–16 season. The contract included an NBA buyout clause, in the original amount of 1 million euros. The buyout amount, however, decreased to 200,000 euros in the summer of 2015. In 2017, he won his first Liga ACB championship with Valencia, after beating Real Madrid 1–3 in the finals.

NBA draft rights
The Minnesota Timberwolves selected Dubljević in the 2013 NBA draft, at 59th overall. In 2019, his draft rights were traded to the Portland Trail Blazers. On February 9, 2023, Dubljević's draft rights were traded to the New York Knicks in a four-team trade involving the Trail Blazers, Philadelphia 76ers and Charlotte Hornets.

National team career
Dubljević played with the junior national teams of Montenegro, being a part of the All-Tournament team at the 2011 FIBA Europe Under-20 Championship. With the senior Montenegrin national basketball team, Dubljević played at the 2013 EuroBasket and the 2017 EuroBasket.

Career statistics

EuroLeague

|-
| style="text-align:left;"| 2014–15
| style="text-align:left;" rowspan=4| Valencia
| 8 || 2 || 22.9 || .511 || .429 || .917 || 4.1 || .9 || .9 || .3 || 15.5 || 16.5
|-
| style="text-align:left;"| 2017–18
| 24 || 17 || 20.2 || .471 || .371 || .814 || 5.0 || 1.4 || .5 || .1 || 10.8 || 13.3
|-
| style="text-align:left;"| 2019–20
| 26 || 11 || 23.5 || .514 || .349 || .828 || 6.5 || 1.7 || .6 || .2 || 14.2 || 18.0
|-
| style="text-align:left;"| 2020–21
| 29 || 24 || 22.4 || .457 || .333 || .797 || 5.8 || 2.4 || .9 || .2 || 9.8 || 13.6
|- class="sortbottom"
| style="text-align:left;"| Career
| style="text-align:left;"|
| 87 || 64 || 22.1 || .486 || .358 || .824 || 5.6 || 1.8 || .7 || .2 || 11.9 || 15.1

Awards and accomplishments
Valencia
EuroCup: 2014, 2019
Liga ACB: 2017
Supercopa: 2017
Individual
All-EuroCup First Team: 2017, 2019
All-EuroCup Second Team: 2012, 2014, 2022
EuroCup Rising Star: 2013, 2014
All-ACB First Team: 2016–17, 2018–19
All-ACB Second Team: 2017–18
Spanish League Finals MVP: 2017
Montenegrin junior national team
2011 FIBA Europe Under-20 Championship: All-Tournament Team

References

External links

Bojan Dubljević at Liga ACB 
Bojan Dubljević at DraftExpress.com

Bojan Dubljević at EuroLeague

1991 births
Living people
2019 FIBA Basketball World Cup players
ABA League players
Centers (basketball)
KK Budućnost players
KK Lovćen players
Liga ACB players
Minnesota Timberwolves draft picks
Montenegrin expatriate basketball people in Spain
Montenegrin men's basketball players
Power forwards (basketball)
Sportspeople from Nikšić
Valencia Basket players